Oleksandr Zozulya (born 11 April 1996) is a Ukrainian professional footballer who plays as a defender for Znicz Biała Piska.

Zozulya is a product of the RVUFK Kyiv and FC Metalurh Donetsk Youth Sportive School Systems. He spent time in the different Ukrainian Reserves League or amateur clubs, but in summer 2016 signed a contract with FC Zirka in the Ukrainian Premier League.

He made his debut in the Ukrainian Premier League for FC Zirka on 20 November 2016, playing in the match against FC Volyn Lutsk.

References

External links
 
 

1996 births
Living people
Ukrainian footballers
Association football defenders
Ukraine youth international footballers
FC Inhulets-2 Petrove players
FC Zirka Kropyvnytskyi players
FC UkrAhroKom Holovkivka players
FC Krystal Chortkiv players
Tomasovia Tomaszów Lubelski players
Ukrainian Premier League players
III liga players
IV liga players
Sportspeople from Kropyvnytskyi
Ukrainian expatriate footballers
Expatriate footballers in Poland
Ukrainian expatriate sportspeople in Poland